Andreea-Florina Constantinescu  (born ) is a retired Romanian female volleyball player.

She was part of the Romania women's national volleyball team at the 2002 FIVB Volleyball Women's World Championship in Germany. On club level she played with VC Unic Piatra Neamt.

Clubs
 VC Unic Piatra Neamt (2002)

References

1977 births
Living people
Romanian women's volleyball players
Place of birth missing (living people)